Vĩnh Hậu may refer to several communes in Vietnam, including:

Vĩnh Hậu, An Giang, a commune of An Phú District
Vĩnh Hậu, Bạc Liêu, a commune of Hòa Bình District
Vĩnh Hậu A, a commune of Hòa Bình District in Bạc Liêu Province